Janaki in Iran may refer to:
 Janaki, Fars